Ellaville is a city in Schley County, Georgia, United States. The population was 1,812 at the 2010 census. The city is the county seat of Schley County.

Ellaville is part of the Americus Micropolitan Statistical Area.

History
A town named Pond Town was established in 1812 along the stage coach in the area that is now the location of the Ellaville City Cemetery. The area was then part of the lands belonging to the Muscogee (Creek) Nation. In 1821, after the Treaty of Indian Springs the area became part of the state of Georgia. In 1826, it served as temporary county seat for Lee County upon the creation of the then vast county. Pond Town soon became a lively town noted for horse racing and whiskey. In 1831, the area became part of Sumter County.

Ellaville was founded in 1857 as county seat of the newly formed Schley County. It was incorporated as a town in 1859. The community was named after the daughter of a first settler.

Lynchings
The hanging of Charles Blackman occurred in Ellaville, Georgia, on January 25, 1889
In January 1911 a white man died in a Black owned store. He was taken for his own safety to Columbus for three months but when he returned three months later a mob 200 strong lynched Dawson Jordan, Charles Pickett, and Murray Burton as well as burning down three black lodges, a church and a school. 
October 1912, a prisoner seized from the Sumter County sheriff near Oglethorpe was hung from a bridge and shot dead
June 1913, twenty-four-year-old Will Redding was dragged from the Ellaville's city jail strung up on a street corner and riddled with bullets.
Will Jones was lynched in Ellaville, Georgia by a white mob on February 13, 1922.

Geography

Demographics

2020 census

As of the 2020 United States census, there were 1,595 people, 610 households, and 438 families residing in the city.

2000 census
As of the census of 2000, there were 7,438 people, 621 households, and 416 families residing in the city. The racial makeup of the city was 34.34% White, 62.74% African American, 0.19% Native American, 1.18% from other races, and 1.55% from two or more races. Hispanic or Latino of any race were 3.48% of the population.

There were 621 households, out of which 35.9% had children under the age of 18 living with them, 40.4% were married couples living together, 22.7% had a female householder with no husband present, and 32.9% were non-families. 30.8% of all households were made up of individuals, and 13.7% had someone living alone who was 65 years of age or older.  The average household size was 2.57 and the average family size was 3.22.

In the city, the population was spread out, with 31.5% under the age of 18, 8.3% from 18 to 24, 25.8% from 25 to 44, 22.2% from 45 to 64, and 12.2% who were 65 years of age or older.  The median age was 33 years. For every 100 females, there were 80.8 males.  For every 100 females age 18 and over, there were 77.5 males.

The median income for a household in the city was $21,724, and the median income for a family was $30,409. Males had a median income of $27,500 versus $19,615 for females. The per capita income for the city was $12,320.  About 29.2% of families and 27.3% of the population were below the poverty line, including 36.7% of those under age 18 and 38.3% of those age 65 or over.

Education

Schley County School District 
The Schley County School District holds pre-school to grade twelve, and consists of one elementary school and one middle-high school. The district has 66 full-time teachers and over 1,126 students.

Schley County Elementary School
Schley Middle High School

Infrastructure
Ellaville is served by U.S. Route 19, Georgia State Route 26 and Georgia State Route 153.

Notable people
 Charles Frederick Crisp, Speaker of the United States House of Representatives
 William J. Sears, Congressman from Florida
 Brent Cobb, singer
 Caylee Hammack, singer
Blaire Erskine, comedian

See also 

 Hanging of Charles Blackman

References

 - Total pages: 624

Cities in Georgia (U.S. state)
Cities in Schley County, Georgia
County seats in Georgia (U.S. state)
Americus, Georgia micropolitan area
Former county seats in Georgia (U.S. state)